The Our Lady of Divine Providence Church is a religious building that is linked to the Catholic Church and is located on Leeward Highway, on the island of Providenciales, part of the British overseas territory of the Turks and Caicos Islands in the Caribbean.

The temple follows the Roman or Latin rite and depends on the mission sui juris of the Turks and Caicos Islands (Missio Sui Iuris Turcensium et Caicensium).

Religious services in the church are given in English and additionally in Spanish and Haitian Creole few days.

See also
Our Lady of Divine Providence

References

External links 
 

Roman Catholic churches in the Turks and Caicos Islands
Buildings and structures in Providenciales